Shamiso Mutasa (born 9 June 1994) is a Zimbabwean footballer who plays as a forward. She has been a member of the Zimbabwe women's national team.

Club career
Mutasa played for Herentals Queens FC in Zimbabwe.

International career
Mutasa capped for Zimbabwe at senior level during  the 2020 COSAFA Women's Championship.

References

1994 births
Living people
Zimbabwean women's footballers
Women's association football forwards
Zimbabwe women's international footballers